Multishow ao Vivo: Vanessa da Mata is a live album and DVD from Brazilian singer Vanessa da Mata, produced by the channel Multishow.

Multishow ao Vivo was recorded live at the historic town of Paraty, and brings in the repertoire songs that marked the career of da Mata, including "Não me Deixe So", "Ai, Ai, Ai", "Eu Sou Neguinha", and "Vermelho", in addition to the song "Acode" (composed by da Mata), remakes of "Um Dia, Um Adeus" (Guilherme Arantes), and "As Rosas Não Falam" (Cartola). "As Rosas Não Falam" featured guitarist Rogério Caetano.

Track listing
Baú
Vermelho
Quando Um Homem Tem Uma Mangueira no Quintal
Ilegais
Ainda Bem
Amado
Fugiu Com A Novela
Um Dia, um Adeus
Viagem / Mamãe Passou Açúcar Em Mim
Não Me Deixe Só
Você Vai Me Destruir
Ai, Ai, Ai
As Rosas Não Falam
Boa Sorte / Good Luck

Notes

2008 live albums
2008 video albums
Vanessa da Mata albums
Live video albums